Ivan Huljić (born 17 January 1988) is a Croatian composer and songwriter. He first emerged as a songwriter in 2006 with the song "Zadnja epizoda" for the popular Croatian band Magazin. He has since written songs for Croatian pop singers, including Doris Dragović, Domenica, Damir Kedžo, Joško Čagalj Jole and Lorena. In addition to the lyrics, Ivan Huljić has also served as the composer and producer for several songs. Huljić has received numerous awards for his music and songwriting work, including Best Song at the Split Festival for "Mi protiv nas". In addition to his songwriting work, Huljić also served as a keyboard player for the band Magazin. In 2022, he served as the creative director for the Fusion World Music Festival held for the first time in Split.

Early years
Ivan Huljić was born on 17 January 1988 in Split, Croatia to father Tonči Huljić, a musician, producer and composer and Vjekoslava Huljić, a lyricist, songwriter and writer. He has an older sister, pop singer and performer Hana Huljić. Huljić first started playing keyboards, when he was 9 years old. He finished high school at the private gymnasium Kraljica Jelena where he finalized all the exams related to music school. Already in high school, Huljić was convinced to serve as the keyboard player with Magazin by his father, although he was initially reluctant to take on such a role. Huljić finished law studies at the University of Split.

Career

2006–2010: Keyboardist and songwriting for Magazin
He first played keyboards for the song "Piši mi" in 2008 when he joined the band at the restaurant Kokolo. He has since played in the group for several years. Huljić first emerged as a songwriter in 2006 when he wrote the song "Zadnja epizoda" for the popular Croatian band Magazin. He continued writing the lyrics and music of several of the band's songs while Ivana Kovač served as the main singer. In addition to that, since 2008, he also served as the keyboard player for the band. In 2011, Huljić was credited as one of the keyboardists for the album Bižuterija by Jelena Rozga.

2015–present: songwriting, composing and creative director debut
In 2015, Huljić together with Vjekoslava, served as the producer and songwriter of several songs on Doris Dragović's album Ja vjerujem, including "Ni riči", "Svit ne more znat", "Zvir". In 2018, Huljić received the award for Best Song at the Split Festival for the song "Mi protiv nas" for which he served as the main songwriter and was performed by Domenica and Damir Kedžo. In 2021, Huljić wrote the music to "Sna'ću se ja" by Doris Dragović.

In the summer of 2022, Huljić served as the creative director of the World Music Fusion Festival in Split which marked his first musical project on such a scale. He invented the festival's concept which featured performances by international as well as Croatian artists. He commented that with the festival, he wanted to fight against the 2022 economic crisis in Europe. After the success of the show, Huljić also announced his plans to work on a 3-day festival the following year.

In the summer of 2022, he wrote the music and lyrics for the song "Shakespeare" by Joško Čagalj Jole which was released on 7 June 2022 and wrote the music and collaborated on the lyrics with Vjekoslava of the song "Sve smo mogli imat" by Doris Dragović released on 23 June 2022.

Creative process
In 2022, Ivan Huljić stated during an interview, that he finds it important to work on several fronts in the music-making process simultaneously, including creative, lyrical and musical direction, to "break the monotony". He has revealed that the biggest musical inspiration comes when he performs on the guitar or the piano. He has also worked on librettos and lyrics for musicals together with Vjekoslava Huljić, which have not managed to come to fruition due to restrictions and delays caused by the COVID-19 pandemic. In 2022, Huljić stated that he prefers to refrain from giving interviews and only do it a few times long term.

Discography
The full discography of writing or composing credits is taken from Ivan Huljić's profile on the Croatian Copyright Collection Society for the Music Sector.

"Zadnja epizoda" (2007)
"Ni riči" (2008)
"O meni će pričat potiho" (2008)
"Svit ne more znat" (2008)
"Zvir" (2008)
"Ako dođem pameti" (2011)
"Akužaj" (2011)
"Ankoran" (2011)
"Imberlan (instrumental)" (2011)
"Juda" (2011)
"Love song" (2011)
"Parti vrime (instrumental)" (2011)
"Samo jubav ostaje" (2011)
"Tramuntana" (2011)
"A tebe nima" (2012)
"Bolje odat nego stat" (2012)
"Kekereke (Čućaj mala)" (2012)
"Ja san rojen da mi bude lipo" (2012)
"Lara ekstaza" (2012)
"Lara exotic" (2012)
"Lara odlazak" (2012)
"Lara oluja" (2012)
"Lara orient" (2012)
"Providenca (najava)" (2012)
"Ajvar" (2013)
"Day light" (2013)
"Dešina tema" (2013)
"Gasi se ljubav (glas)" (2013)
"Judita (glas)" (2013)
"Konavle (glas)" (2013)
"Maro" (2013) 
"Nad Srđem (glas)" (2013)
"Osjećaj ljubavi (glas)" (2013)
"Stradun (glas)" (2013)
"Tužna ljubavna (glas)" (2013)
"Uvertira (glas)" (2013)
"Zora dubrovačka (glas)" (2013)

"Suton (klavir)" (2014)
"Doza rizika (ljubakanje)" (2015)
"Jubavi rič" (2015)
"Čemu nervoza" (2016)
"Majina tema" (2016)
"Natašina tema" (2016)
"Ne znan za se" (2016)
"Nikolina tema" (2016)
"Nisam papak – sjetna" (2016)
"Ružina tema" (2016)
"Tema Prava žena" (2016)
"Kad sam s tobom" (2017)
"Mi protiv nas" (2017)
"Bilo naroda" (2018)
"Brod za nabolje" (2018)
"Kao prekjučer" (2018)
"Pišem na tebe" (2018)
"Tihi ocean" (2018)
"Tower of Babylon" (2018)
"Drowning" (2019)
"Ljubi majku zemlju" (2020)
"Medenjak" (2020)
"Shakespeare" (2020)
"Sna'ću se ja" (2020)
"Sve smo mogli imat" (2020)
"Boje" (2021) 
"Gospođica" (2021) 
"Foot in mouth" (2022)
"Izbor je tvoj" (2022)
"Che Guevara i manistra u suvo"
"Judi od cakla" 
"Kakvi san ja kralj – podloga"
"Lara sanjarenje" 
"Lara sjetna" 
"Mana"
"Najava zla"

References

External links 
 Ivan Huljić on Discogs
 Ivan Huljić at Zamp.hr, the Croatian Copyright Collection Society for the Music Sector

1988 births
Living people
People from Split, Croatia
Lyricists